Rapolas is a Lithuanian masculine given name, a cognate of the name Raphael, and may refer to:
Rapolas Ivanauskas (born 1998), Lithuanian basketball player
Rapolas Okulič-Kazarinas (1857–1919), Lithuanian Army major general
Rapolas Šaltenis (1908–2007), Lithuanian journalist, author, translator, and teacher
Rapolas Skipitis (1887–1976), Lithuanian politician and attorney

References

Masculine given names
Lithuanian masculine given names